Foothill High School is located in Bakersfield, California and serves grades 9–12.

Accomplishments
Their speech and debate team won the State Championship (small schools) in 2004.

In 2010, the "We The People" team made it to state for the first time in the school's history. Although they did not make it to the final rounds in the capital, Unit 4 of the team received a Unit award out of the remaining 7 schools.

On May 30, 2013, Foothill High School had their fiftieth commencement ceremony;  the 2013 graduating class received a commemorative trophy and one-of-a-kind diploma covers with the school's golden anniversary Trojan emblem.

Notable alumni

Jon Baker, NFL and CFL player
Joey Porter - NFL Player - Pittsburgh Steelers, Miami Dolphins, Arizona Cardinals
Rashaan Shehee - NFL running back
Lonnie Shelton - NBA Player - New York Knicks, Seattle SuperSonics, Cleveland Cavaliers 1982 all-star
Chris Childs, former New York Knicks guard

References

External links
 Foothill High School
 Class of 1964 (Website for First Graduating Class Alumni)

High schools in Bakersfield, California
International Baccalaureate schools in California
Public high schools in California
1962 establishments in California